Hadrianus may refer to:

People
 Hadrian (76–138), Roman emperor
 Gaius Fabius Hadrianus, Roman colonial administrator & politician
 Pope Adrian (disambiguation) (any of the listed popes)
 Hadrianus Junius (1511–1575), also known as Adriaen de Jonghe

Other
 7446 Hadrianus, an asteroid
 Hadrianus (genus), an extinct genus of tortoise
The origin of the Emperor family, Hadria Picena or Hatria the modern Atri in Abruzzo region, Italy

See also